Kyonggi University (KGU) is an accredited, private higher education institution, established in 1947. KGU has over 17,000 students in majors in undergraduate and graduate programs on two campuses. The main campus is in Suwon, located 30 miles from the capital Seoul. The Seoul campus is located in Seodaemun District.

KGU has 11 colleges containing 63 programs of study and 12 graduate schools offering majors. The strength in KGU's academic programs and research lies in Tourism, Hospitality, Arts and Design, Business, International Studies, Environmental Engineering, and Architectural Engineering. KGU teaches some courses in English.

KGU has established a sister-university relationship with 152 universities in 31 countries. KGU has a Korean language program. Over 650 international students study at KGU.

Currently, the president is Kim In-kyu.

Symbols 
If there is an unlimited possibilities and low power of the sea, it can be said that the activity stage of the students of Gyeonggi University is going to be the world.

It is like the shape of the students of our Kyonggi University that they are not easily frustrated or resigned, but are tired of their persistence and commitment to their goals.

The dynamic shape of a turtle sitting on a globe can be said to represent the futures of our players.

History 
Founder: Dr. Son Sang-kyo
 1947 - Choyang Kindergarten Teacher's School
 1957 - Kyonggi Institute
 1964 - Kyonggi College, Seoul
 1979 - Suwon Campus opened
 1984 - Kyonggi College upgraded to Kyonggi University

Departments

Undergraduate schools 
 College of Humanities
 College of Social Sciences
 College of Law
 College of Economic and Administration
 College of Tourism Sciences
 College of Natural Sciences
 College of Engineering
 Kyonggi International College
 College of Arts
 College of Physical Sciences

Graduate schools 
 Alternative Medicine
 Architecture
 Arts & Design
 Education
 Industrial Technology and Information
 Information & Communication
 International Studies
 Politics & Policy
 Public Administration
 Service Business Administration
 Social Welfare
 Sports Sciences
 Tourism Management
 Traditional Arts

Notable alumni
 Cha Tae-hyun, actor
 Chae Young-in, actress
 Chun Woo-hee, actress
 Go Na-eun, actress and singer (Papaya)
 Han Jin, model
 Hwang Youn-joo, volleyball player
 Jo Sung-mo, singer
 Ju Ji-hoon, actor
 Kim Hyun-joong, actor and singer (SS501)
 Kim Hyung-jun, actor and singer (SS501 and Double S 301)
 Kim Seung-soo, actor
Kwon Hwa Woon, actor
 Lee Jin, actress and singer (Fin.K.L)
 Lee Tae-gon, actor
 Lee Won-jong, actor
 Nam Sang-ji, actor
 Park Jung-min, actor and singer (SS501)
 Shim Eun-jin, actress and singer (Baby V.O.X)
 Song Seung-heon, actor
 Yoon Hae-young, actress
 Yoon Ji-on, actor
 Yoon Shi-yoon, actor
 Yoon Sun-woo, actor
 Jun Jin, host and singer (Shinhwa)

References

External links 

 Official homepage 

 
Universities and colleges in Seoul
Universities and colleges in Suwon
1947 establishments in South Korea
Educational institutions established in 1947
Seodaemun District